Streptomyces harbinensis is a bacterium species from the genus of Streptomyces which has been isolated from roots of the soybean Glycine max in Harbin in the Heilongjiang province in China. Streptomyces harbinensis produces ikarugamycin

See also 
 List of Streptomyces species

References

Further reading

External links
Type strain of Streptomyces harbinensis at BacDive -  the Bacterial Diversity Metadatabase

harbinensis
Bacteria described in 2013